The shooting competitions at the 1988 Summer Olympics took place in Seoul, South Korea. Competitions were held in a total of thirteen events—seven men's events, four women's events, and two events open to both genders. It was the first games for the 10 metre air pistol events, and the last for the 50 metre running target event, later replaced by 10 metre running target. It was also the first time the Olympic shooting competitions included finals for the top eight (in some cases six) competitors.

Medal summary

Medal table

Men's events

Women's events

Mixed events

Participating nations
A total of 396 shooters, 285 men and 111 women, from 66 nations competed at the Seoul Games:

References

External links

 
1988 Summer Olympics events
1988
Olympics
Shooting competitions in South Korea